Chilliwack-Fraser Canyon was a federal electoral district in the province of British Columbia, Canada, that was represented in the House of Commons of Canada from 2004 to 2015.

Geography
The district includes the City of Chilliwack, the Districts of Hope and Kent (which includes the town of Agassiz, the small towns along the Fraser Canyon north to and including the Village of Lytton and the District of Lillooet, plus the rural settlements and mountain towns of the Bridge River Country.

History
The electoral district was created in 2003 principally from Fraser Valley riding with additional parts from Cariboo—Chilcotin, Pitt Meadows—Maple Ridge—Mission, Okanagan—Coquihalla and West Vancouver—Sunshine Coast.

The 2012 electoral redistribution dissolved this riding into Chilliwack—Hope and Mission—Matsqui—Fraser Canyon, with a small portion going to West Vancouver—Sunshine Coast—Sea to Sky Country. This came into effect for the 2015 election.

Members of Parliament

Election results

See also
 List of Canadian federal electoral districts
 Past Canadian electoral districts

References

 Library of Parliament Riding Profile
 Expenditures - 2008
 Expenditures - 2004

Notes

External links
 Website of the Parliament of Canada

Former federal electoral districts of British Columbia
Lillooet
Politics of Chilliwack